Robel Estiwal García Rodriguez (born March 28, 1993) is a Dominican professional baseball infielder who is currently a free agent. He made his Major League Baseball (MLB) debut with the Chicago Cubs in 2019.

Career

Cleveland Indians
García signed with the Cleveland Indians as an international free agent out of the Dominican Republic in February 2010 at 16 years old. After four seasons, he was released by the Indians on his twenty-first birthday in March 2014. He had topped out in the Class A Midwest League in 2012 and 2013.

After his release, he moved to Verona to be with his Dominican-Italian wife and their children. He began playing independent baseball there in 2016 and joined Redskins Imola and then Fortitudo Bologna of the Italian Baseball League in 2017. In 2018, he played for UnipolSai Bologna and was a member of the Italy national baseball team that played in the 2018 Super 6 baseball tournament.

Chicago Cubs
After being spotted during an exhibition series for Italy in the Arizona Instructional League, García signed a minor league deal with the Cubs in November 2018. He started the 2019 season with the Tennessee Smokies before being promoted to the Iowa Cubs after 22 games.

On July 3, 2019, the Cubs selected García's contract and promoted him to the major leagues. He made his debut that night as a pinch hitter for Brandon Kintzler and struck out in his first at-bat. On July 4, 2019, Robel tripled off Jordan Lyles for his first MLB hit. He also singled and hit a solo home run in the game against the Pittsburgh Pirates.

Cincinnati Reds
García was claimed off waivers by the Cincinnati Reds on July 26, 2020. García did not play in a game for Cincinnati in 2020.
After the 2020 season, he played for Águilas Cibaeñas of the Dominican Professional Baseball League. He has also played for Dominican Republic in the 2021 Caribbean Series.

New York Mets
On October 26, 2020, García was claimed off waivers by the New York Mets. On February 1, 2021, García was designated for assignment following the acquisition of Jordan Yamamoto.

Los Angeles Angels
On February 3, 2021, García was claimed off waivers by the Los Angeles Angels. On February 25, 2021, García was designated for assignment by the Angels following the waiver claim of Jack Mayfield.

Houston Astros
On February 27, 2021, García was claimed off waivers by the Houston Astros.  García played in 46 games for the Astros in 2021, struggling to a .151 batting average with 1 home runs and 8 RBI's. On September 15, 2021, the Astros designated García for assignment.
On September 18, he cleared waivers and was sent outright to the Triple-A Sugar Land Skeeters.

Chicago Cubs (second stint)
On March 21, 2022, Garcia signed a minor league deal with the Chicago Cubs. Garcia played in 41 games for Triple-A Iowa, hitting .295 with 12 home runs and 30 RBI's. On June 4, the Cubs released Garcia to pursue a career overseas.

LG Twins
On June 5, 2022, Garcia signed with the LG Twins of the KBO League. He was released on October 7, 2022.

Personal life
García is a citizen of the Dominican Republic and a naturalized Italian citizen. His wife, with whom he has at least three children, is Dominican-Italian.

References

External links

1993 births
Living people
Águilas Cibaeñas players
Arizona League Indians players
Chicago Cubs players
Dominican Republic expatriate baseball players in the United States
Fortitudo Baseball Bologna players
Houston Astros players
Iowa Cubs players
Italian expatriate baseball players in the United States
Italian people of Dominican Republic descent
Sportspeople of Dominican Republic descent
Lake County Captains players
Mahoning Valley Scrappers players
Major League Baseball players from the Dominican Republic
Major League Baseball infielders
National baseball team players
Naturalised citizens of Italy
People from San Juan Province (Dominican Republic)
Sugar Land Skeeters players
Tennessee Smokies players
Naturalised sports competitors
2023 World Baseball Classic players